The Adayga Mosque also known as Aw Musse mosque or Haji Musse mosque is small mosque in the historical Hamar Weyne district in Mogadishu.

Overview 
The mosque can be found in the small ancient alleyways of Hamar Weyne and can be easily missed, as it is in the midst of houses. Maria Rosario La Lomia put forward the hypothesis that the mosque could have been built in the 13th century due to the similarities of the minaret of the 'Adayga to the minaret of Jama'a Xamar Weyne. The mosques name comes from the fact that you'd find a Salvadora persica tree which twigs is customarily used as a toothbrush, hence the name 'Adayga which in Somali means whitener or toothbrush. The mosque has recently been reconstructed again and has lost some of its features.

See also 

 Jama'a Shingani, Shingani
 Fakr ad-Din Mosque
 Arba'a Rukun Mosque
 Jama'a Xamar Weyne, Xamar Weyne
 Awooto Eeday
Mohamed Al Tani
Twin Mosques

References 

Mosques in Somalia
Buildings and structures in Mogadishu